Beagle Hotel was a historic inn and tavern located near Valley Grove, Ohio County, West Virginia. It was built before 1827 and operated as the Beagle Hotel until 1893.  Attached to the hotel was a general store.  Both buildings were 2 1/2 stories high and covered in clapboard.

It was listed on the National Register of Historic Places in 1993.  The buildings have since been destroyed.

References

Defunct hotels in West Virginia
Demolished buildings and structures in West Virginia
Hotel buildings on the National Register of Historic Places in West Virginia
Hotel buildings completed in 1827
Buildings and structures in Ohio County, West Virginia
National Register of Historic Places in Ohio County, West Virginia
1827 establishments in Virginia